The German Reform Movement may refer to:

 The Protestant Reformation, a 16th-century Christian movement started by the German monk, Martin Luther
 German Reform Movement (New York City, 1800s), a local political association in late 19th century New York City
 Seventh Day Adventist Reform Movement, also known as "German Reform movement"
 German-Jewish Reform Movement, a phase in the history of Reform Judaism